The Uruguay women's national handball team is the national team of Uruguay. It takes part in international handball competitions.

History
The team participated in the 1997, 2001, 2003, 2005 and 2011 editions of the World Championship. 

In 2003 and 2015 they won the bronze medal at the Pan American Games.

Results

World Championship

Pan American Games

Pan American Championship

South and Central American Championship

South American Games

Other Tournaments
2016 Women's Four Nations Tournament – 3rd

Team

Current squad
The following players were named in the squad for the 2011 World Women's Handball Championship:

Technical staff
Head coach: Leonardo Puñales
Assistant coach: Daniela Mata
Manager: Graciela Martínez
Doctor: Sofía González

References

External links

IHF profile

Handball
Women's national handball teams
National team